Stephen Mosher (born July 8, 1964) is an American photographer and activist whose photos appear in Playbill Magazine and The Sweater Book.

Personal life
Mosher was born in Dallas, Texas to a businessman and an artist. He is the second of four children and was schooled in Europe. First, in Portugal at the schools St. Dominics and St. Columbans, and later in Switzerland at The International School of Zurich and The International School of Berne. Mosher returned to America in 1982 and attended Tarrant County Junior College and North Texas State University, where he met his husband, Pat Dwyer, in 1985. In 1993 the couple relocated from Texas to New York City, where they continue to reside.

Career

Photography
Mosher gave up his childhood dream of being an actor in 1988 when he decided to stop performing, turning his hobby of photography into his career focus. While living in Dallas, Mosher worked doing pictures in the local theater scene; headshots, publicity stills, and performance photos. In 1993, he and Dwyer moved to New York so that Mosher could focus on his project The Sweater Book, a photo collection of people wearing the same cardigan sweater. It was Mosher's ambition to publish the collection in book form and to donate the proceeds to AIDS/HIV charities. The Sweater Book was published in 2003 by Thomas Dunne Books and features hundreds of people, most notably Whoopi Goldberg, Laura Linney, Glenn Close, Christopher Meloni, Noah Wyle, Maggie Smith, Jason Alexander, Stephen Collins, Sela Ward, Sarah Michelle Gellar, Jane Krakowski, Hugh Laurie, Kristin Chenoweth, Bryan Cranston, Swoosie Kurtz, Tim Allen, Loretta Devine, Ryan Phillippe, Mary Steenburgen, Ted Dansen, Matthew Broderick, Sarah Jessica Parker, Carol Burnett and many more. Mosher lived bicoastally while working on The Sweater Book, working both in New York and Hollywood, where he became staff photographer for Noah Wyle's Blank Theatre Company.

Mosher also spent the 1990s photographing performers such as Deborah Cox, Kristine W., Anita Gillette, Christian Campbell, Eli Wallach, David Alan Basche, Nora Dunn, Gregory Jbara, Diahann Carroll, Mireille Enos, Paul Anthony Stewart, Daphne Rubin-Vega, Alfie Boe, Drea de Matteo, Jennifer Lopez, Matthew Morrison, Alan Cumming, Jason Scott Lee, Jennifer Holliday, Chita Rivera, Carole King, Petula Clark, Helen Reddy, Bernadette Peters, Joanna Gleason, Donna Murphy and Judi Dench.

After the publication of The Sweater Book, Mosher took time off from his photography to focus on his interests in health, fitness, and blogging.  He returned to photography in 2010 and continues to blog about the arts, weight loss, body building, photography, spirituality, addiction, and many other topics.

Other

From 2013 to 2017 Mosher was a contributing columnist for the internet magazine EDGE, as well as providing content for the EDGEONTHENET website, on the subject of Health and Fitness.

In 2014 Mosher completed his course of study and is now an ACE Certified Personal Trainer and an American Red Cross Certified Lifeguard.

In 2016 Stephen Mosher published his memoir titled Lived in Crazy focusing on his life, family and the creation of The Sweater Book.

In 2017 Mosher made his New York City nightclub debut at the famed Don't Tell Mama club and restaurant. In the 80 minute show titled "The Story Teller" he recounted about his life in songs and stories. Journalist Bart Greenberg of Cabaret Scenes Magazine declared the show a "surprising cabaret debut" and praised Mosher's "pleasant voice that flowed between a whiskey tenor and a Bea Arthur baritone."

Mosher had a career in event coordination for six years executing both private and corporate parties, as well as weddings.

Activism
In 2011, Mosher and his husband, Pat Dwyer celebrated 25 years together by getting married in every American jurisdiction where same sex marriage is legal Their adventure was captured by filmmaker Allan Piper and was turned into the documentary Married and Counting (2013.) The film is narrated by George Takei and features original music by Jennifer Houston. Mosher and Dwyer hoped that the film, as well as their YouTube channel, would help promote gay rights and marriage equality.

References

External links

Married and Counting

Living people
1964 births
American photographers
University of North Texas alumni